Saint Augusta, formerly named Ventura, is a city in Stearns County, Minnesota, United States, directly south of the city of St. Cloud. The population was 3,497 at the 2020 census.

St. Augusta is part of the Saint Cloud Metropolitan Statistical Area.

History
Originally Saint Augusta Township, it incorporated as a city on May 2, 2000 in order to avoid annexation by the city of Saint Cloud. St. Augusta was named in the 1850s after a local church.  The city contains one property listed on the National Register of Historic Places: the 1873 St. Mary Help of Christians Church and its 1890 rectory.

For a short time Saint Augusta was officially named Ventura in honor of then Governor Jesse Ventura, but voters decided on its current name months after incorporation, and the name was officially changed to Saint Augusta on November 7, 2000.

Geography

Minnesota State Highway 15 and County Route 7 are two of the main routes in Saint Augusta.  Interstate 94/U.S. Highway 52 and County Route 75 skirt the northeastern border of St. Augusta.  The city of Saint Cloud is to the immediate north and northeast of Saint Augusta.

Demographics

2010 census
As of the census of 2010, there were 3,317 people, 1,154 households, and 937 families living in the city. The racial makeup of the city was 97.4% White, 0.5% African American, 0.1% Native American, 0.7% Asian, 0.3% from other races, and 0.9% from two or more races. Hispanic or Latino of any race were 0.6% of the population.

There were 1,154 households, of which 39.9% had children under the age of 18 living with them, 71.9% were married couples living together, 4.6% had a female householder with no husband present, 4.7% had a male householder with no wife present, and 18.8% were non-families. 13.2% of all households were made up of individuals, and 3.7% had someone living alone who was 65 years of age or older. The average household size was 2.86 and the average family size was 3.13.

The median age in the city was 36.6 years. 27.1% of residents were under the age of 18; 7% were between the ages of 18 and 24; 28.2% were from 25 to 44; 29.4% were from 45 to 64; and 8.3% were 65 years of age or older. The gender makeup of the city was 50.5% male and 49.5% female.

2000 census
As of the census of 2000, there were 3,065 people, 987 households, and 838 families living in the township. The racial makeup of the township was 98.79% White, 0.07% African American, 0.03% Native American, 0.52% Asian, 0.03% from other races, and 0.55% from two or more races. Hispanic or Latino of any race were 0.39% of the population.

There were 987 households, out of which 47.4% had children under the age of 18 living with them, 76.5% were married couples living together, 5.5% had a female householder with no husband present, and 15.0% were non-families. 11.2% of all households were made up of individuals, and 3.7% had someone living alone who was 65 years of age or older.  The average household size was 3.11 and the average family size was 3.38.

In the township the population was spread out, with 31.6% under the age of 18, 8.5% from 18 to 24, 30.8% from 25 to 44, 22.9% from 45 to 64, and 6.2% who were 65 years of age or older.  The median age was 34 years. For every 100 females, there were 102.4 males.  For every 100 females age 18 and over, there were 103.9 males.

The median income for a household in the township was $57,292, and the median income for a family was $60,000. Males had a median income of $36,148 versus $24,554 for females. The per capita income for the township was $21,712.  About 2.1% of families and 2.3% of the population were below the poverty line, including none of those under age 18 and 22.6% of those age 65 or over.

Education
Most of St. Augusta is in the St. Cloud Area School District. A portion is in the Kimball Public School District.

Three elementary schools have boundaries including portions of the St. Cloud section: Clearview, Discovery, and Oak Hill. All of the St. Cloud school district portion of St. Augusta is zoned to South Middle School and Technical Senior High School.

References

External links
City Website

Cities in Minnesota
Cities in Stearns County, Minnesota
St. Cloud, Minnesota metropolitan area
Defunct townships in Minnesota
Populated places established in 2000